Progress Chef (formerly Chef) is a configuration management tool written in Ruby and Erlang. It uses a pure-Ruby, domain-specific language (DSL) for writing system configuration "recipes". Chef is used to streamline the task of configuring and maintaining a company's servers, and can integrate with cloud-based platforms such as Amazon EC2, Google Cloud Platform, Oracle Cloud, OpenStack, IBM Cloud, Microsoft Azure, and Rackspace to automatically provision and configure new machines. Chef contains solutions for both small and large scale systems.

Features 

The user writes "recipes" that describe how Chef manages server applications and utilities (such as Apache HTTP Server, MySQL, or Hadoop) and how they are to be configured. These recipes (which can be grouped together as a "cookbook" for easier management) describe a series of resources that should be in a particular state: packages that should be installed, services that should be running, or files that should be written. These various resources can be configured to specific versions of software to run and can ensure that software is installed in the correct order based on dependencies. Chef makes sure each resource is properly configured and corrects any resources that are not in the desired state.

Chef can run in client/server mode, or in a standalone configuration named "chef-solo". In client/server mode, the Chef client sends various attributes about the node to the Chef server. The server uses Elasticsearch to index these attributes and provides an API for clients to query this information. Chef recipes can query these attributes and use the resulting data to help configure the node.

Traditionally, Chef was used to manage Linux but later versions add support for  Microsoft Windows.

It is one of the major configuration management systems on Linux, along with CFEngine, Ansible and Puppet. More than a configuration management tool, Chef, along with Puppet and Ansible, is one of the industry's most notable Infrastructure as Code (IAC) tools.

History 

Chef was created by Adam Jacob as a tool for his consulting company, whose business model was to build end-to-end server/deployment tools. Jacob showed Chef to Jesse Robbins, who saw its potential after running operations at Amazon. They founded a new company with Barry Steinglass, Nathen Haneysmith, and Joshua Timberman to turn Chef into a product.

The project was originally named "marionette", but the word was too long and cumbersome to type; naming the format modules were prepared in "recipe" led to the project being renamed "Chef".

In February 2013, Opscode released version 11 of Chef. Changes in this release included a complete rewrite of the core API server in Erlang.

In April 2019, the company announced that the source code for their software would continue to be released under the Apache 2.0 license, while binaries would only be available under the terms of a proprietary license. In response, the Cinc project began releasing Apache 2.0 licensed binaries of several Chef products.

On September 8, 2020, Progress announced the acquisition of Chef.

Platform support 

Chef is supported on multiple platforms according to a supported platforms matrix for client and server products. Major platform support for clients includes AIX, Amazon Linux, Debian, CentOS/RHEL, FreeBSD, macOS, Solaris, SUSE Linux, Microsoft Windows and Ubuntu. Additional client platforms include Arch Linux and Fedora. Chef Server is supported on RHEL/CentOS, Oracle Linux, SUSE Linux and Ubuntu.

Customers
Chef is used by Facebook, AWS OpsWorks, Prezi, and BlackLine.

See also

Comparison of open-source configuration management software
Infrastructure as code (IaC)
Infrastructure as Code Tools
 Ansible (software)
 CFEngine (software)
 DevOps
 DevOps toolchain
 Otter (software)
 Puppet
 Salt (software)
 Juju

References

External links
 
 Chef on GitHub

Free software programmed in Ruby
Free software programmed in Erlang
Configuration management
Orchestration software
Virtualization software for Linux
Software using the Apache license